Fernanda Brito (born 14 February 1992) is an inactive Chilean tennis player.

She has a career-high WTA ranking of 274 in singles, achieved on 26 November 2018, and 380 in doubles, reached on 14 September 2015. Brito has won 30 singles titles and 34 doubles titles on tournaments of the ITF Circuit.

She has been a member of the Chile Fed Cup team since 2011.

ITF Circuit finals

Singles: 53 (30 titles, 23 runner–ups)

Doubles: 56 (34 titles, 22 runner–ups)

Notes

References

External links
 
 
 

1992 births
Living people
Tennis players from Santiago
Chilean female tennis players
Tennis players at the 2015 Pan American Games
Pan American Games competitors for Chile
South American Games bronze medalists for Chile
South American Games medalists in tennis
Competitors at the 2018 South American Games
Tennis players at the 2019 Pan American Games
21st-century Chilean women